Kevin James Clifton (born 13 October 1982) is an English professional dancer and actor who was a professional dancer on the BBC TV series Strictly Come Dancing, having previously worked as an assistant choreographer. He has also featured on Burn the Floor. He was given the nickname "Kevin from Grimsby" by Sir Bruce Forsyth.

On 15 December 2018, Clifton won the sixteenth series of Strictly with his celebrity partner Stacey Dooley, who has been his girlfriend since 2019. He appeared in every year's final from when he joined the show in 2013, with the exception of 2017 and 2019. He announced on 6 March 2020 that he was leaving the show, saying that he wanted to focus on "other areas of his career."

Early life 
Clifton started dancing ballroom and Latin as a child in his home village of Waltham, near Grimsby, taught by his parents, former World Champions Keith and Judy Clifton. He competed nationally and internationally as a child initially partnering his sister Joanne. Later, when they both chose to move on to different partners he chose Latin as his primary dance style so as not to directly compete against his sister. He was a Youth World Number 1 and four time British Latin Champion and won International Open titles in Italy, Germany, Spain, Portugal, Sweden, Japan, France, Hong Kong, Taiwan, Singapore, Slovenia, Slovakia, Finland and Belgium. At the time of his retirement from competitive dancing in 2007, he was ranked 7th in the world.

Career
In 2010, Clifton made his musical theatre debut in Dirty Dancing The Musical at the Aldwych Theatre in London's West End, where he partnered BBC1's So You Think You Can Dance winner, Charlie Bruce. From January 2008 to June 2013, Clifton and his future wife Karen Hauer were principal dancers of the Burn The Floor Dance Company, performing in the show's record breaking Broadway run, as well as starring at the Shaftesbury Theatre in London's West End. He also performed with the show in Japan, Australia, South Africa and the United States, as well as making guest appearances on Dancing with the Stars in the United States and So You Think You Can Dance in the Netherlands. They rejoined Burn The Floor as principal dancers for a short tour of Australia and Japan in Spring 2014.

He appeared on Series 5 of Hacker Time.

Strictly Come Dancing

Highest and lowest scoring performances per dance

In 2013, Clifton appeared on series 11 of Strictly Come Dancing and was partnered with Susanna Reid. He had previously auditioned for the show with his partner Karen Hauer, but they had only needed a female dancer at the time, so he was instead employed as a choreographer for the show in 2012. In the 2013 Blackpool performance of the show he was joined in the opening dance by his family. On the same show, Reid and Clifton scored 39/40 for their paso doble, putting them at the top of the leaderboard. He won the 2013 Strictly Come Dancing Pro Challenge becoming the Guinness World Records holder for most Drunken Sailors in 30 seconds The couple's popularity ensured they reached the final, on 21 December, where they finished as runners up with Natalie Gumede behind model Abbey Clancy.

In 2014's series 12 of Strictly Come Dancing Clifton was paired with pop star Frankie Bridge. They were declared the runners-up with Simon Webbe beaten by Caroline Flack and Pasha Kovalev. In 2015, Clifton, recently married to co-professional dancer Karen Hauer, returned for the thirteenth series of the show and was partnered up with EastEnders actress Kellie Bright. Bright and Clifton scored a perfect 40 for their Tango and Showdance and eventually finished as joint runners up with Georgia May Foote and Giovanni Pernice.

Clifton has also taken part in the 'Strictly live tour'. For the 2014 tour he continued his partnership with series 11 partner, Susanna Reid. He was due to dance again with Frankie Bridge for the 2015 tour, but she had to pull out due to pregnancy, he instead danced with series 6 contestant Rachel Stevens. Clifton and Bridge were however reunited for the 2016 tour.

In 2016 Clifton again took part in Strictly Come Dancing, where he partnered singer and media personality Louise Redknapp. On 17 December 2016, Clifton became the first professional dancer in the show's history to compete in four consecutive finals; he was also the only professional dancer not to be in the dance-off. For the fourth time, Clifton finished as a series runner-up, after he and Redknapp lost out in the final result to Ore Oduba and Ore's partner, (Kevin's sister) Joanne.

For series 15 in 2017, Clifton was partnered with Scottish comedian Susan Calman. Calman expressed her great delight at the partnering with Clifton, of whom she is a fan. They were eliminated on week 10, after a dance-off against Alexandra Burke and Gorka Márquez. This was the first time Clifton did not make it to final.

For series 16, in 2018, Clifton was partnered with English television presenter and journalist, Stacey Dooley. The couple were the series winners. 

He partnered TV host Anneka Rice for the series seventeen, in 2019, they were the second couple to be eliminated after the judges chose to save David James and Nadiya Bychkova; making this Clifton's shortest series to date. He did however return to dance with former footballer Alex Scott for weeks 6 & 7 while Scott's normal partner Neil Jones was recovering from an injury to his Calf muscle. Following this series, Clifton chose to quit the show to “focus on other projects”.

Series 11 with celebrity partner Susanna Reid

Series 12 with celebrity partner Frankie Bridge

1 Week 3 featured Donny Osmond as a guest judge, he scored Frankie and Kevin a 10, making their official total 45

Series 13 with celebrity partner Kellie Bright

Series 14 with celebrity partner Louise Redknapp

Series 15 with celebrity partner Susan Calman

1 In Week 5, Bruno Tonioli took a week off the show due to his work schedule.

Series 16 with celebrity partner Stacey Dooley

1Alfonso Ribeiro stood as a guest judge in place of Bruno Tonioli

Series 17 with celebrity partners Anneka Rice & Alex Scott

After fellow professional Neil Jones was injured, Clifton also partnered professional footballer Alex Scott in weeks 6 and 7.

Dance tours and other professional engagements
In August 2017, Kevin & Karen Clifton announced they would be touring the UK again in 2018 with their theatre tour 'Kevin and Karen Dance', following their first nationwide tour in 2017. He also played Stacee Jaxx in the 2018-19 UK Tour of Rock of Ages and in September 2022, he will star in the UK Tour of Strictly Ballroom directed by Strictly Judge Craig Revel Horwood. He will star as the Artilleryman in the upcoming 2022 Tour of Jeff Wayne's Musical Version of The War of the Worlds from March to April.

Personal life 
Clifton grew up in the small North East Lincolnshire town of Waltham, attending the East Ravendale Primary school, where he was notable for his Michael Jackson impressions. He later attended Caistor Grammar School, doing well academically before choosing to pursue his dance career rather than attend the sixth form. 

Clifton has been married three times. His first marriage was to a dance partner when he was 20 years old. He then married professional dancer Clare Craze. They split up in 2010 and their divorce was finalised in 2013. He then married fellow professional dancer Karen Hauer, having proposed to her on her birthday, on stage during a performance of Burn the Floor. They wed on 11 July 2015. On 15 March 2018, Clifton confirmed he and Karen Hauer were no longer together romantically. 

In 2019, it was confirmed that Clifton was dating his most recent Strictly Come Dancing celebrity partner Stacey Dooley. It was announced via Twitter on 26 August 2022 that they were expecting their first child together.  In January 2023, Dooley gave birth to their daughter named Minnie.

Business career
Clifton currently owns a property investment business with a friend, describing it in an interview as a 'second career'.

Philanthropy
As well as taking part in various charity campaigns and visits in his role as a Strictly professional, Clifton is also a patron of the Wheelchair DanceSport Association and the 2014 Dance Proms.

References

Living people
1982 births
Strictly Come Dancing winners
People from the Borough of North East Lincolnshire
People educated at Caistor Grammar School
British ballroom dancers
English businesspeople in property
21st-century English businesspeople